Syringaldehyde is an organic compound that occurs in trace amounts widely in nature. Some species of insects use syringaldehyde in their chemical communication systems. Scolytus multistriatus uses it as a signal to find a host tree during oviposition.

Because it contains many functional groups, it can be classified in many ways -  aromatic, aldehyde, phenol. It is a colorless solid (impure samples appear yellowish) that is soluble in alcohol and polar organic solvents. Its refractive index is 1.53.

Natural sources 
Syringaldehyde can be found naturally in the wood of spruce and maple trees.

Syringaldehyde is also formed in oak barrels and extracted into whisky, which it gives spicy, smoky, hot and smoldering wood aromas.

Preparation 
This compound may be prepared from syringol by the Duff reaction:

See also 

Phenolic content in wine
Syringol
Syringic acid
Acetosyringone
Sinapyl alcohol
Sinapinic acid
Sinapaldehyde
Sinapine
Canolol

References 

Insect pheromones
O-methylated natural phenols
Hydroxybenzaldehydes
Phenol ethers